Josiah Webbe (April 1767 – 9 November 1804) was an English East India Company servant who worked as Chief Secretary at Madras and as a Resident at Mysore and later in the court of the Maharaja of Scindia.

Webbe was the son of George Webbe of Nevis and Mary Fenton Dasent and entered the service of the East India Company as a writer on July 26, 1783. His ability to deal with Indian languages made him popular.  He advised against hostile actions towards Tipu Sultan which displeased Lord Mornington and the directors of the East India Company leading to his removal from the service of Arthur Wellesley. In 1803, he was posted Resident to the newly acquired kingdom of Mysore and the next year, he was posted by Wellesley to the Court of the Maharaja of Scindia in Gwalior. He died at Hussainabad on the banks of Narmada. A monolithic granite obelisk to him was erected at Srirangapatnam by Dewan Purnaiah. A monument by John Flaxman was installed at St. Mary's Church in Fort St. George. Webbe left his wealth to his sister Fanny Francklyn (née Webbe).

References 

1767 births
1804 deaths
British East India Company civil servants